Toechima monticola, also known as mountain tamarind, is a species of plant in the lychee family that is endemic to Australia.

Description
The species grows as a small tree, with a DBH rarely more than 20 cm. The pinnate leaves have 4–10 leaflets, which are 6–16.5 cm long and 2.8–5.2 cm wide. The flowers occur in inflorescences. The roundish orange fruits are about 20 mm in diameter.

Distribution and habitat
The species is restricted to the area between Mount Spurgeon and the southern margin of the Atherton Tableland, with elevations of 700–1200 m, in the understorey of mature mountain rainforest in tropical Far North Queensland.

References

monticola
Flora of Queensland
Sapindales of Australia
Taxa named by Sally T. Reynolds
Plants described in 1985